Yevgeny Yurevich Yepov (4 October 1988 — 27 January 2012) was a sergeant of the MVD Spetsnaz who was posthumously awarded the title Hero of the Russian Federation.

On 27 January 2012 Epov was killed in battle in Kizlyarsky District, Dagestan. During the battle, a militant threw a grenade that landed near his unit. He jumped onto it, shielding other soldiers from injury. Three other soldiers died in the battle.

Epov was posthumously awarded with the Hero of the Russian Federation medal by a presidential decree on 28 April 2012. The medal was presented to Epov's family on 20 July 2012.

References

1988 births
2012 deaths
Deaths by hand grenade
Heroes of the Russian Federation